Year 1338 (MCCCXXXVIII) was a common year starting on Thursday (link will display the full calendar) of the Julian calendar.

Events 
<onlyinclude>

Date unknown 
  Hundred Years' War: Louis IV, Holy Roman Emperor appoints Edward III of England as a vicar-general of the Holy Roman Empire. Louis supports Edward's claim to the French throne, under the terms of the Treaty of Koblenz.
 Philip VI of France besieges Guienne in Southwest France, and his navy attacks Portsmouth, England.
 Ashikaga Takauji is granted the title of shōgun by the emperor of Japan, starting the Ashikaga Shogunate.
 Nicomedia is captured by the Ottoman Empire.
 Black Death plague strain originates near Lake Issyk-Kul in modern Kyrgyzstan, according to Syriac tombstone inscriptions and genetic material from exhumed bodies.

Births 
 January 13 – Jeong Mong-ju, Korean civil minister, diplomat and scholar (d. 1392) 
 January 21 – Charles V of France (d. 1380)
 February 3 – Joanna of Bourbon, queen consort of France (d. 1378)
 March 23 – Emperor Go-Kōgon of Japan, Northern Court emperor during a conflict between two imperial lines (d. 1374)
 October 5 – Alexios III of Trebizond (d. 1390)
 November 29 – Lionel of Antwerp, 1st Duke of Clarence (d. 1368)
 date unknown
 George de Dunbar, 10th Earl of March (d. 1420)
 Muhammed V, Sultan of Granada (d. 1391)
 Niccolò II d'Este, Marquis of Ferrara (d. 1388)
 Thomas de Ros, 4th Baron de Ros (d. 1383)
 Margaret de Stafford (d. 1396)
 Tvrtko I of Bosnia (d. 1391)

Deaths 
 April 8 – Stephen Gravesend, Bishop of London 
 April 24 – Theodore I, Marquess of Montferrat (b. c. 1270)
 May – John Wishart, Scottish bishop 
 May 5 – Prince Tsunenaga, son of the Japanese Emperor (b. 1324)
 May 23 – Alice de Warenne, Countess of Arundel, English noble (b. 1287)
 June 10 – Kitabatake Akiie, Japanese governor (b. 1318; d. in battle)
 July – Muhammad Khan, Persian monarch
 August 4 – Thomas of Brotherton, 1st Earl of Norfolk (b. 1300)
 August 17 – Nitta Yoshisada, Japanese samurai (b. 1301; d. in battle)
 August 22 – William II, Duke of Athens (b. 1312)
 December 21 – Thomas Hemenhale, Bishop of Worcester
 date unknown
 Alfonso Fadrique, Sicilian noble
 Awhadi Maraghai, Persian poet
 Marino Sanuto the Elder, Venetian statesman and geographer (b. c. 1260)
 Nitta Yoshiaki, Japanese samurai
 probable – Prince Narinaga, Japanese shōgun (b. 1325)

References